Raymond A. Hull (born September 18, 1963) is an American politician and a Democratic member of the Rhode Island House of Representatives representing District 6 since January 2011. During the legislative session beginning in 2015, Hull was one of three African-American members of the Rhode Island House of Representatives.

Education
Hull attended the University of Rhode Island, earned his BA in criminal justice from Roger Williams University, and earned his MA in administration of justice from Anna Maria College.

2020 Legislation
In February 2020, Hull introduced a bill to create a DCYF legislative oversight commission. He was also named to lead the coronavirus vaccine distribution task force.

Elections
2012 In a rematch of their 2010 contest, Hull was challenged by former Representative Peter N. Wasylyk in the September 11, 2012 Democratic Primary, winning with 1,160 votes (74.4%) and was unopposed for the November 6, 2012 General election, winning with 4,182 votes.
2010 Hull challenged District 6 incumbent Representative Wasylyk in the September 23, 2010 Democratic Primary, winning with 1,396 votes (59.5%) and was unopposed for the November 2, 2010 General election, winning with 2,195 votes.

References

External links
Official page at the Rhode Island General Assembly
Campaign site

Raymond Hull at Ballotpedia
Raymond A. Hull at the National Institute on Money in State Politics

Place of birth missing (living people)
1963 births
Living people
African-American state legislators in Rhode Island
Anna Maria College alumni
Democratic Party members of the Rhode Island House of Representatives
Politicians from Providence, Rhode Island
Roger Williams University alumni
Roger Williams University School of Law alumni
University of Rhode Island alumni
21st-century American politicians
21st-century African-American politicians
20th-century African-American people